Vernon Monroe Swartz (January 1, 1897 – January 13, 1980), nicknamed "Dazzy", was a pitcher in Major League Baseball. He played for the Cincinnati Reds.

References

External links

1897 births
1980 deaths
Major League Baseball pitchers
Cincinnati Reds players
Baseball players from Ohio